Firing Line is an American public affairs show founded and hosted by conservative William F. Buckley Jr.

This is a list of episodes that aired originally from 1966 to 1969.

Episodes

Season 1 (1966)

Season 2 (1967)

Season 3 (1968)

Season 4 (1969)

References

External links
 

Lists of American non-fiction television series episodes